CFCH-FM (90.5 FM) is a Canadian radio station in North Bay, Ontario. Owned by Vista Radio, it broadcasts a country format branded as Country 90.5.

History
On September 27, 2018, the CRTC issued call applications to operate new operate a new commercial FM radio station to serve North Bay, Ontario. Vista Broadcast Group,  the owner of CFXN-FM North Bay submitted an application to operate a new FM station in North Bay on the frequency of 90.5 MHz.
At the time, no formats were announced for the new proposed station. On October 29, 2019, Vista Radio Ltd. (formerly Vista Broadcast Group) applied for a broadcasting licence to operate an oldies music station in North Bay. The station would operate with an effective radiated power of 45,800 watts, and would broadcast 126 hours of local programming per broadcast week.

On May 25, 2020, the CRTC approved an application by Vista Radio for a new FM radio station in North Bay, which would operate on the frequency 90.5 MHz, and carry an oldies format.

Return of CFCH and Launch
In June 2020, Vista announced that it had acquired the heritage callsign CFCH, which once belonged to what is now Rogers-owned CKFX-FM. Vista Radio's owner Sherry Brydson is a granddaughter of CFCH's original owner Roy Thomson, and she described the station as being established in Thomson's legacy. From 2005 to 2014, the CFCH callsign was previously used at an unrelated radio station in Chase, British Columbia.

On June 15, 2021, at 7:15 am ET, CFCH-FM officially signed on the air at 90.5 FM as Country 90.5. Its first song on the air was "Outlaws and Outsiders," the first gold-certified single by North Bay’s Cory Marks.
 
This makes it the first country music station on FM in the North Bay market since CKAT took over the original CFCH's AM 600 frequency, and CFCH moved to 101.9 FM, adopting the new callsign CKFX in the 1990s. The launch of Vista Radio's new Country 90.5 also makes Rogers Media's CKAT the second country radio station in the North Bay market with the similar branding of CKAT's Country 600.

References

External links
Country 90.5
 broadcasting history.ca Canadian Communications Foundation
 

Fch
Fch
Fch
Radio stations established in 2021
2021 establishments in Ontario